"Working on the Highway" is a 1984 song written and performed by Bruce Springsteen. It was released on the album Born in the U.S.A. and has remained a popular concert song for Springsteen and the E Street Band.

As with some of the other songs on the Born in the U.S.A. album, including "Downbound Train" and the title track, "Working on the Highway" was originally recorded on January 3, 1982, with the demo tracks that eventually became the Nebraska album.  The acoustic version of the song had a working title of "Child Bride", and did not include the rock melody or the title refrain.  The version of the song that was released on the album was recorded on May 6, 1982, at the Power Station, at the end of the "Electric Nebraska" sessions.

Although "Working on the Highway" was not one of the seven Born in the U.S.A. songs to be released as a single, it remained popular in concert, with 367 performances through 2016. It is nearly always paired with "Darlington County" in performance.

At a July 26, 1992 performance of the song, Springsteen's mother danced with her son towards the end of the song, prompting Springsteen to say "A boy's best friend is his mother," referencing a line from the Alfred Hitchcock film Psycho.

Personnel
According to authors Philippe Margotin and Jean-Michel Guesdon:

Bruce Springsteen – vocals, guitars, handclaps
E Street Band
Steven Van Zandt – guitars, handclaps
Danny Federici – organ, handclaps
Garry Tallent – bass, handclaps
Max Weinberg – drums, handclaps

References

External links
 Lyrics & Audio clips from Brucespringsteen.net

1984 songs
Bruce Springsteen songs
Songs written by Bruce Springsteen
Song recordings produced by Jon Landau
Song recordings produced by Bruce Springsteen
Song recordings produced by Steven Van Zandt
Song recordings produced by Chuck Plotkin